Rock of Life is the 11th studio album by Australian singer-songwriter Rick Springfield, issued by RCA Records in 1988. The record peaked at a modest No. 55 on the Billboard album chart, selling approximately 350,000 copies in United States.  It was the least successful of Springfield's RCA album releases.

The title track, however, was a successful single, reaching No. 22 on the Billboard Hot 100. A second single, "Honeymoon in Beirut" was Springfield's only single not to chart in Billboard's Hot 100 during his eight years on the label.

This album was Springfield's last album of new material for RCA Records. Although not a commercial success, Rock of Life did garner some positive reviews from critics. People reviewer Ralph Novak pointed out that "even [Springfield's] standard romantic tunes get away from romantic cliches."

Shortly after the release of this album, Springfield took a break from his music career to spend more time with his wife and children, as well as focus on his acting career. He would not release another solo album for 11 years, though he did release a group album in 1997 with Sahara Snow.

Cash Box called the title track a "ballsy, reggae-like track that nearly tears apart the speakers" with influences from Sting and Peter Gabriel.

Track listing
All songs written by Rick Springfield, except where noted.
"Rock of Life" - 3:52
"Honeymoon in Beirut" - 4:28
"World Start Turning" - 5:41
"One Reason (To Believe)" - 4:05
"Soul to Soul" - 4:46
"Tear It All Down" - 4:17
"Woman" - 5:53
"Dream in Colour" (Springfield, Jeff Silverman) - 4:32
"Hold On to Your Dream" - 4:38
"(If You Think You're) Groovy" (Steve Marriott, Ronnie Lane) - 4:00

Total length: 45:53

Charts

Personnel
Rick Springfield - vocals, guitar, keyboards, sampler, percussion, backing vocals
Randy Jackson - bass
Curt Cress - drums, percussion
Rose Banks, Tommy Funderbunk - backing vocals

See also
Rick Springfield discography

References

1988 albums
Rick Springfield albums
RCA Records albums